V. K. Ebrahim Kunju is an Indian politician, who was the former Minister for Public Works of the Government of Kerala. He represented the Kalamassery constituency in Kerala from 2011 to 2021.

Life and Family 
V. K. Ebrahim Kunju was born at Kongorpilly, Aluva on 20 May 1952 to V. U. Khader and Chithumma. His wife is Nadeera and they have three children Adv. Abdul Gafoor, Abbas and Anwar. He has qualified 10th standard as schooling. His son V E Abdul Gafoor contested from Kalamassery Constituency to Kerala Legislative Assembly in 2021 polls.

Political career 
V. K. Ebrahim Kunju was the Minister for Industry and Social Welfare in the previous UDF Ministry. He entered politics through Muslim Students Federation and Muslim Youth League. He has served as the chairman and chief executive of Forest Industries (Travancore) Ltd.

He was elected to Kerala Legislative Assembly in 2001, 2006, 2011 and 2016 elections. In 2006 Kerala Legislative Assembly election, V. K. Ebrahim Kunju represented Mattancherry constituency after defeating M C Josephine of CPI(M). In 2016 Kerala Legislative Assembly election, Ebrahim Kunju represented Kalamassery assembly constituency.

Following the resignation of Muslim League leader, P.K. Kunhalikutty the then Minister for Industries on 4 January 2005, after Ice cream parlour sex scandal, V. K.Ebrahim Kunju was chosen to represent party inside the UDF cabinet. Subsequently, he assumed office on 6 January 2005 as the Minister for Industries and Social Welfare. He became the Minister for Public Works from 23 May 2011 to 20 May 2016 in the second Oommen Chandy ministry.

In addition to his legislative responsibilities, V. K. Ebrahim Kunju worked in various organizations in Kerala.

Minister of Public Works 

V. K. Ebrahim Kunju was the Minister of Public Works during the period from 18 May 2011 to 20 May 2016. Oommen Chandy was the chief minister during the period.

Achievements 
During the period, as per the list published by Oommen Chandy, 227 bridges worth Rs. 1600 crore were built across Kerala under the Ministership of V. K. Ebrahim Kunju. Such huge development works are unprecedented and cover all districts of Kerala as listed below.

A number of State Highways were constructed including all regions of the state under Second Chandy ministry, and the final decision to widen the National highways of the state to 45 m was taken in 2014.

Cancer Diagnosis

V. K. Ebrahim Kunju was diagnosed with multiple myeloma cancer and underwent chemotherapy. As per medical reports he needs further treatment. Doctors added that he has serious health issues and requires continuous medical care.

Awards 
V. K. Ebrahim Kunju was awarded many accolades for his exemplary development works as Minister.

Controversies

Palarivattom Flyover Scam 
 V. K. Ebrahim Kunju was the 12th minister in the second Oommen Chandy ministry (2011–16) to be charged with graft by the Vigilance and Anti-Corruption Bureau. Both Enforcement Directorate (ED) and Vigilance and Anti-Corruption Bureau (VACB) are conducting investigation against V K Ebrahim Kunju in the alleged money laundering case and Palarivattom flyover corruption case.
 5 February 2020: Kerala Governor Arif Mohammed Khan granted permission to prosecute former PWD minister and Muslim League leader VK Ebrahim Kunju MLA in the Palarivattom flyover scam.
 29 February 2020: The vigilance and anti-corruption bureau interrogated V. K. Ebrahim Kunju.
 9 March 2020: The Kerala Vigilance and Anti-Corruption Bureau conducted raids at the residence of V K Ebrahim Kunju in Kochi.

Money Laundering 

 15 November 2019: The Kerala High Court ordered the Enforcement Directorate (ED) to investigate the case involving allegations of money laundering against former PWD minister VK Ebrahim Kunju. He is accused of depositing Rs 10 crores into the bank accounts of IUML's mouthpiece Chandrika when high-value currency notes of Rs 500 and Rs 1000 were banned by the central government in November 2016.
 29 May 2020: Vigilance and Anti-Corruption Bureau interrogated V K Ebrahim Kunju in connection with money laundering case. He entered into controversy after he offered Gireesh Babu, the complainant Rs 5 lakh to withdraw the complaint.

Assembly polls in Kerala will be held on 6 April as declared by Election Commission. Vigilance probe team plans to submit chargesheet before Kerala Assembly Polls.

References 

State cabinet ministers of Kerala
Living people
Indian Union Muslim League politicians
Kerala MLAs 2001–2006
Kerala MLAs 2006–2011
Kerala MLAs 2011–2016
Year of birth missing (living people)
People with multiple myeloma